State Route 53 is a north–south state highway in the U.S. state of Ohio (physically northeast-southwest). Its southern terminus is at the beginning of the U.S. 68/S.R. 67 concurrency in Kenton, Ohio, and its northern terminus is on Catawba Island in Ottawa County, north of Port Clinton.

Route description
From Kenton, State Route 53 moves northeast to Forest, then continues eastward to Upper Sandusky.  It then moves north through the small towns of Tymochtee and McCutchenville before entering Tiffin.  The route then moves due north to Fremont, where it joins a four-route bypass around the city with U.S. Routes 6 and 20 and State Route 19.  From its northern bypass interchange, it continues on a northeast heading, following the northern coastline of Sandusky Bay to Port Clinton, where it joins State Route 2 on a bypass around that city.  From its eastern bypass interchange, State Route 53 heads north onto Catawba Island.

History
State Route 53 was an original state highway which stretched from the Ohio River at Higginsport to Port Clinton.  The route followed that of current State Route 221 to Georgetown, then followed the route currently followed by U.S. Route 68 to Kenton, then along its current route into Port Clinton.  The route entered Port Clinton and truncated at State Route 163.  

Before the Fremont bypass was certified, State Route 53 was routed along the Sandusky River through Old Fort into Fremont.  

In 1929, State Route 53 was routed through the town of St. Martin, a town it originally bypassed.  This  reroute was reversed in 1931 and is now State Route 251.

In 1933, State Route 53's southern terminus was moved to Kenton when U.S. Route 68 was certified.

In 1946, State Route 53's northern terminus was extended to Catawba Island.  It shared a route with State Route 163 for approximately five miles, then split north to the island.  This route was formerly the southern portion of State Route 357.

Major junctions

References

053
Transportation in Hardin County, Ohio
Transportation in Wyandot County, Ohio
Transportation in Seneca County, Ohio
Transportation in Sandusky County, Ohio
Transportation in Ottawa County, Ohio